Guards Corps or Guard Corps may refer to:

Guards Corps (German Empire), a unit of the Prussian and Imperial German armies
Guards Reserve Corps, a unit of the Imperial German Army
Guard Corps (Haganah), a unit of the Zionist paramilitary organisation Haganah
Islamic Revolutionary Guard Corps, a branch of the Iranian Armed Forces

See also
Gardes du Corps (Prussia)
Russian Guards
Imperial Guard (Napoleon I)
Imperial Guards (Qing Dynasty)